This list is of the Places of Scenic Beauty of Japan located within the Prefecture of Kumamoto.

National Places of Scenic Beauty
As of 1 November 2021, ten Places have been designated at a national level.

Prefectural Places of Scenic Beauty
As of 1 May 2021, three Places have been designated at a prefectural level.

Municipal Places of Scenic Beauty
As of 1 May 2021, thirty Places have been designated at a municipal level, including:

Registered Places of Scenic Beauty
As of 1 November 2021, one Monument has been registered (as opposed to designated) as a Place of Scenic Beauty at a national level.

See also
 Cultural Properties of Japan
 List of parks and gardens of Kumamoto Prefecture
 List of Historic Sites of Japan (Kumamoto)
 List of Cultural Properties of Japan - paintings (Kumamoto)

External links
  Cultural Properties in Kumamoto Prefecture

References

Tourist attractions in Kumamoto Prefecture
Places of Scenic Beauty

ja:Category:熊本県にある国指定の名勝